Yajalón is a city and one of the 119 Municipalities of Chiapas, in southern Mexico.

As of 2010, the municipality had a total population of 34,028, up from 26,044 as of 2005. It covers an area of 162.3 km².

As of 2010, the city of Yajalón had a population of 16,622. Other than the city of Yajalón, the municipality had 247 localities, the largest of which (with 2010 populations in parentheses) were: Amado Nervo (1,362), and Lázaro Cárdenas (1,151), classified as rural.

Grolier Codex is believed to have been found in the Yajalon area. Carlson 2013

References

Municipalities of Chiapas